The Czech Women's Curling Championship is the national championship of women's curling in the Czech Republic. It has been held annually since 1991 and organized by the Czech Curling Association.

List of champions
Teams line-up in order: fourth, third, second, lead, alternate, coach; skips marked in bold.

References

See also
Czech Men's Curling Championship
Czech Mixed Curling Championship
Czech Mixed Doubles Curling Championship
Czech Junior Curling Championships